The following is a list of notable Sri Lankan engineers.

A
 Mahesh Amalean

B
 Cecil Balmond

D
 P. Dayaratna
 Prashantha De Silva
 Salinda Dissanayake

E
 Saman Ediriweera

G
 Lalith Gamage
 U. N. Gunasekera

I
 Abhaya Induruwa

J
 C. L. V. Jayathilake
 Theodore Godfrey Wijesinghe Jayewardene

K
 Sam Karunaratne
 A. N. S. Kulasinghe

L
 E P B Liyanage

M
 Mohan Munasinghe

N
 Udaya Nanayakkara

P
 Rohan Pathirage
 Denis Perera

R

S
 Nalin Seneviratne
 Kanagaratnam Sriskandan
 Premala Sivaprakasapillai Sivasegaram

W
 Mallory Evan Wijesinghe
 Ray Wijewardene
 D. J. Wimalasurendra

See also

 
Engineers
Sri Lankan